Norrköping is a city in the province of Östergötland in eastern Sweden and the seat of Norrköping Municipality, Östergötland County, about 160 km southwest of the national capital Stockholm, 40 km east of county seat Linköping and 60 km west of the Södermanland capital of Nyköping. The city has a population of 95,618 inhabitants in 2016, out of a municipal total of 130,050, making it Sweden's tenth largest city and eighth largest municipality.

The city is situated by the mouth of the river Motala ström, at Bråviken, an inlet of the Baltic Sea. Water power from the Motala ström and the good harbour were factors that facilitated the rapid growth of this once industrial city, known for its textile industry. It has several nicknames such as: "Sweden's Manchester", "Peking" and "Surbullestan" (Surbulle [sour bun] was a local nickname for the textile workers, and stan is short for Staden, which means The City or The Town in Swedish).

History
The city has medieval foundations by settlers around the Motala stream estuary, who used the falls and rapids to power their mills. The stream was also full of fish such as salmon. Exact dates are uncertain, but there are mentions of a church in the 12th century. It was dedicated to Saint Olaf, Norway's patron.

The first trace of the city's name is from 1283, when Sophia of Denmark donated her rights of salmon fishing to the Skänninge monastery. The town is estimated to have received city status in the early 14th century, although no written documents exist prior to a document from 1384. This document, signed by Albrekt of Sweden is stored in the city archive today. Köping means there was a market there, while Nörr or Norr means "north". There is a smaller town nearby named Söderköping, or "South market".

The city was the location of several battles in the ensuing centuries. As a consequence, nothing of the medieval Norrköping remains today. During the Northern Seven Years' War (1563–1570), the entire southern part of Norrköping was burnt. It was rebuilt by John III of Sweden, who designed the current street pattern.

In 1618, a weapon industry was established by supervision of Gustavus Adolphus. The harbour also attracted ships due to its proximity to the industries of Finspång. In addition to the weapon industry, a large scale industry of textile was also initiated. An important benefactor was the industrial man Louis De Geer (1587–1652). At De Geer's death, Norrköping had 6,000 inhabitants and was Sweden's second largest city.

The city again burnt in 1655, and again in 1719 during the Russian Pillage of 1719-21 when the Russians burnt it to the ground. Stones from the Johannisborg castle were used to build new houses, and today only a few stones remain.

During the 18th century it was rebuilt and several industries soon got a stronghold: In the 1740s, Norrköping boasted three sugar refineries; in the 1750s the large scale influential snus industry was established. From this time stems the city churches of Saint Olof and Saint Hedvig, and several other old houses. In 1762, the first theater in Sweden outside of Stockholm was established in the city, the Egges Teater.

Norrköping's importance again flourished. In 1769 the Swedish Riksdag assembled there. In 1800 King Gustav IV of Sweden was crowned in the Church of Saint Olof.

In the later 18th and early 19th Centuries, Norrköping was one of the three Swedish cities where Jews were allowed to live (see History of the Jews in Sweden).

The city again suffered fires in 1822 and 1826. Thereafter wooden houses were banned. In 1841 a ship industry was initiated as a branch of Motala Verkstad in Motala. In 1850 the industry had over 600 employees making it Sweden's largest ship industry at the time. During the remaining 19th century, the industries kept expanding. The area by the Motala Stream was developed further with the construction of a cotton refinery, and a paper mill was constructed in 1854, specializing in newspaper, and is still today exporting to customers around the world.

The industry, including textile manufacturers, also expanded into the 20th century. In 1950 a total of 54 factories had 6,600 employees in town. By 1956, however, 18 of them had been closed due to competition from countries abroad with lower wages, such as Italy and Japan. In 1970 only 10 factories and 1,200 employees remained. In that year, the renowned Holmen paper mill, with its 350 years long history, announced closure, and another 900 people were let go. To counter the effects, several governmental authorities were relocated to Norrköping from Stockholm. See also Braviken Paper Mill.

As of 2002, Norrköping is now seeing a revival, as a center of culture and education. The Norrköping symbol represents the "new" Norrköping.

Main sights

The Motala ström river flows through the city has a parade annexed. In connection to the latter is the industrial landscape where the old textile industries once were situated.

In the summer, there is a cactus plantation in Carl Johans Park. 25,000 cacti planted there every summer.

In connection to the large outdoor zoo, there is also Tropicariet, an aquarium, where for example snakes, crocodiles and sharks can be seen.

Other locations of note includes a campus of Linköping University, its own symphonic orchestra, an airport called Kungsängen with 170,000 traveling (2006), a high-tech industry park called Norrköping Science Park, and Petroglyphs from the Nordic Bronze Age.

Climate
Norrköping had a humid continental climate (Dfb) for the reference period of 1961–1990, but it was borderline four-season oceanic (Cfb) during that period and has since more resembled the latter, with somewhat warmer temperatures year-round. In spite of it being located near the Baltic Sea, Norrköping has a relatively dry climate with precipitation levels averaging  between 1961 and 1990. That would in turn be very low for a marine climate, but some way above more arid climates. The humidity for most of the year combined with there being no pronounced dry season keeps the surroundings green in spite of the rain shadow effect. Winter precipitation is quite low, but often falls as snow. On August 26, 2016, Norrköping set a nationwide record for the hottest temperature in the latter parts of August with  during a sudden and brief burst of extreme heat.

Demography

Notable natives

 Thecla Åhlander – stage and film actress
 Hannes Alfvén – physicist, Nobel Prize winner
 Joannes Olaus Alnander – 18th Century author
 Johannes Årsjö – heavy weight champion
 Malin Baryard – Olympic equestrian
 Amy Diamond – singer
 Eldkvarn – music group
 Eva Gothlin – historian
 Elin Grindemyr – model
 Peter Harryson – actor, entertainer
 Ove Kindvall - soccer player
 Markus Krunegård – solo singer and member of Laakso
 Laakso – music group
 Charlotta Löfgren – poet
 Mats Löfving – police chief 
 Fredrik Lundberg – entrepreneur
 Herman Theodor Lundgren – entrepreneur
 Marduk – music group
 Moa Martinson – author
 Ture Nerman – poet and socialist politician
 Christoffer Nyman - professional footballer
 Betty Olsson - suffragist and peace activist
 Magnus Pääjärvi-Svensson – NHL hockey player
 Slagsmålsklubben – electronic popgroup
 Carl Swartz – former prime minister
 Jeffery Taylor – basketball player
 Michael B. Tretow – producer and audio engineer
 Pernilla Wiberg – alpine skier, double Olympic gold medalist
 23 Till – music group

Sports
 IFK Norrköping (Association football)
 Norrköping Dolphins (Basketball)
 HC Vita Hästen (Ice hockey)
 Vargarna (Speedway)
 Norrköpings KK (Swimming)

Government Agencies
As part of the Swedish Government decentralisation policies of the 1960s and 1970s, a number of government agencies saw their national headquarters relocated from Stockholm to other parts of the country. A government inquiry suggested in 1970 that six such agencies should be relocated to Norrköping, with a particular focus on maritime and aviation transport and related services.

After parliamentary debate, five agencies were established in Norrköping over a period of years in the early 1970s. While reorganized, restructured and renamed, in general, the same agencies are still headquartered in Norrköping, namely:

 Air Navigation Services of Sweden 
 Swedish Maritime Administration
 Swedish Meteorological and Hydrological Institute
 Swedish Migration Agency
 Swedish Prison and Probation Service

The establishment of government agencies in Norrköping was partly understood as a response to the decline in the textile industry, which had struck Norrköping hard in the 1960s. The city needed new jobs. The relocation of government jobs, however, also meant a major shift in the structure of the city labour market. Unqualified or highly structured industrial work in the private sector was replaced by more than 1 400 qualified and independent work positions in the public sector.

At a later point, the Norrköping cluster of transport authorities was augmented by one more:

 Swedish Transport Agency (Transportstyrelsen)

In 1997, a state university also opened a subsidiary campus in Norrköping, again, relating to the industry changes and being an important part of the government response to unemployment and labour market policy. Although not a headquarter, it is the seventh government agency stationed in Norrköping, and with more than 5 000 students on campus it is a major hub of activities in the city.

 Linköping University, Campus Norrköping

Logistics and Infrastructure
With a deep sea harbour, a position on the Southern Main Line railway, Norrköping Airport and being the intersection of European route E4 and European route E22, Norrköping is particularly well situated for logistics related business. This is further underlined by the presence of three transport related government agencies, the national weather services and Linköping University transports and logistics research and education programmes in place. 

Norrköping is highly involved in the East Link, Ostlänken, which will increase travel speed and freight capacity on the Southern Main Line. As preparation, the Kardonbanan freight feeder line from Norrköping Harbour to the Southern Main Line was inaugurated in February 2021. A new freight railway terminal and a relocation of Norrköping Central Station is currently being studied.

Norrköping is one of two Swedish cities (the other being Gothenburg) that retained its tram system after the 1967 conversion to right-hand drive, see Norrköping Tramway.

Culture
A theatre in Norrköping, Egges Theatre, hosted the first Scandinavian performance of Shakespeare's Romeo and Juliet in 1776, and the city has a long theatre and revue tradition. Current main theatres are East Gothland Theatre, Sweden's biggest regional theatre, opened in 1908, and Arbisteatern, dating from 1865.

A 2016 Swedish drama/documentary, The Sex Temple ("Sextemplet," produced by Swedish Television), shows off both the charming old town and one of its glorious 19th-century theaters (the Arbisteatern) to great effect.

See also
Church of Saint Bridget, Norrköping

References

External links 

 
 Norrköping Tourism 
 Local event guide for Norrköpin

 
Municipal seats of Östergötland County
Swedish municipal seats
Populated places in Östergötland County
Populated places in Norrköping Municipality
Port cities and towns of the Baltic Sea
Market towns in Sweden
Coastal cities and towns in Sweden
Cities in Östergötland County